Anne-Catherine Gillet (born 20 January 1975) is a Belgian operatic soprano.

Life and career 
Born in Libramont-Chevigny, Gillet studied singing at the Conservatoire royal de Liège with Nicolas Christou.

Career 
 Sophie in Der Rosenkavalier by Richard Strauss, Théâtre du Capitole de Toulouse, 2008
 Constance in Dialogues of the Carmelites, 2009
 Perséphone in The Brussels Requiem by Howard Moddy, at La Monnaie, 2010
 Musetta in La Bohème, Puccini, 2010, at La Monnaie, 2010
 Sophie in Werther by Massenet, Opéra Bastille, 2010
 Despina in Così fan tutte by Mozart, Opéra Garnier, 2011 
 Cendrillon by Massenet, at La Monnaie, 2011
 Aricie in Hippolyte et Aricie by Jean-Philippe Rameau, Opéra Garnier, 2012
 Micaëla in Carmen by Georges Bizet, Opéra de Marseille, 2012
 Madame Tell in Guillaume Tell by André Grétry, Opéra Royal de Wallonie, 2013
 Oscar in Un ballo in maschera by Verdi at the chorégies d'Orange in August 2013
 Manon Lescaut in Manon by Jules Massenet at the Opéra de Lausanne in October 2014
 Gilda in Rigoletto by Verdi at the Bolshoi Theatre in December 2014
 Pamina in The Magic Flute by Mozart at the Opéra Royal de Wallonie, December 2015-January 2016

Discography 
 Patrick Ringal-Daxhelet, Anne-Catherine Gillet, Claude Flagel, Patrick Baton (dir.), André Souris - Œuvres symphoniques, Cypres 7607, 2006
  Maria Riccarda Wesseling, Maria Bayo, Deborah York, Núria Rial, Anne-Catherine Gillet, Max Emmanuel Cencic, Kobie Van Rensburg. Dir.: Eduardo López Banzo, Al Ayre Español, Rodrigo (Handel), Naïve Ambroisie, 2008
 Jonas Kaufmann, Sophie Koch, Ludovic Tezier, Anne-Catherine Gillet, Orchestre et Chœurs de l'Opéra de Paris, Michel Plasson, Massenet : Werther, Opéra national de Paris, DVD Decca NTSC 0440 074 3406 2 GH 2, 2010
Anna Caterina Antonacci, Andrew Richards, Anne-Catherine Gillet, Nicolas Cavallier and John Eliot Gardiner, Carmen, FRA Musica 3770002003060, 2010
 Anne-Catherine Gillet, Orchestre Philharmonique royal de Liège, Paul Daniel (dir.), Barber: Knoxville, Berlioz: Les nuits d'été, Britten: Les Illuminations, Aeon 760058 360132, 2011.

References

External links 
 Anne-Catherine Gillet on Les Archives du spectacle
 

1975 births
Living people
People from Libramont-Chevigny
Belgian operatic sopranos
21st-century Belgian women opera singers